Sir Robert Henry Hobart, 1st Baronet,  (13 September 1836 – 4 August 1928) was a British Liberal Party politician.

Biography
Hobart was the oldest son of Hon. Henry Lewis Hobart, third son of the 3rd Earl of Buckinghamshire, and Charlotte Selina Moore, daughter of Richard Moore. He was a civil servant in the War Office between 1860 and 1900, and was appointed a Companion of the Order of the Bath (CB) in 1885. In October 1901 the Earl Marshal, the Duke of Norfolk, appointed him a Secretary to the Earl Marshal's office, to work on preparations for the 1902 coronation of King Edward VII. He received the King Edward VII Coronation Medal, and on 11 August 1902 (two days after the coronation) was knighted as a Knight Commander of the Royal Victorian Order (KCVO) for his services.

Hobart was the Official Verderer of the New Forest and sat as Member of Parliament (MP) for New Forest from 1906 until 1910.

On 14 July 1914, he was created a Baronet, of Langdown, in the County of Southampton.

Election results

Family
On 13 May 1869, Hobart married Hon. Julia Trollope, oldest daughter of the 1st Baron Kesteven. He died in August 1928 aged 91 and was succeeded in the baronetcy by his only son Claud.

References

External links 
 

1836 births
1928 deaths
Baronets in the Baronetage of the United Kingdom
Companions of the Order of the Bath
Knights Commander of the Royal Victorian Order
Members of the Parliament of the United Kingdom for English constituencies
UK MPs 1906–1910
Robert
Liberal Party (UK) MPs for English constituencies